Edmond Ramus  (5 May 1822 – 1890) was a French etcher best known for his translations of paintings for art catalogues.

Ramus was born in Paris and first exhibited at the Paris Salon in 1847. He was a pupil of the etcher Léon Gaucherel. He was awarded a bronze medal in 1881. He is listed as one of the contributors of eaux-fortes in the catalogue of objects for the palais de San Donato in 1880. He worked extensively for the French magazine L'Art.

References

Engravers from Paris
People from Paris
1822 births
1890 deaths